Kim Joo-hee (Hangul: 김주희, born June 30, 1981) is a South Korean beauty pageant Miss Korea titleholder and former Seoul Broadcasting System announcer. She represented her country at the Miss Universe 2006 pageant.

Miss Korea 2005
Kim Joo-hee has been crowned Miss Korea 2005 in an event held at the Grand Hilton Hotel in Seoul on 30 June 2005 beating out 53 other contestants.

Miss Universe 2006
Kim Joo-hee represented South Korea in the Miss Universe 2006 pageant held on 23 July 2006, held in Los Angeles, California, USA.

See also

 Miss Korea
 Seoul Broadcasting System

References

External links
 
 
 Kim Joo-hee at Miss Korea website
 Kim Joo-hee at SBS Announcer website

1981 births
Living people
Miss Universe 2006 contestants
People from Seoul
Miss Korea winners
South Korean announcers
South Korean television presenters
South Korean women television presenters
Yonsei University alumni